is a Japanese politician and the current mayor of Matsue, the capital city of Shimane Prefecture, Japan. He has been the mayor since 2000.

References

External links
  

1948 births
University of Tokyo alumni
Living people
Matsue
People from Shimane Prefecture